Gary Steven Ilman (born August 13, 1943) was an American former competition swimmer, two-time Olympic gold medalist, and former world record-holder in two relay events.

Ilman made his international swimming debut as a member of the U.S. national swimming team at the 1963 Pan American Games in São Paulo, Brazil.  He was a member of the U.S. squad that won the gold medal in the men's 4×200-metre freestyle relay, together with his American teammates Richard McDonough, David Lyons and Ed Townsend.

Ilman represented the United States at the 1964 Summer Olympics in Tokyo, Japan, where he won gold medals as a member of the first-place U.S. teams in the men's 4×100-meter freestyle relay and men's 4×200-meter freestyle relay. In both freestyle relay events, Ilman and his American teammates broke existing world records. Steve Clark, Mike Austin, Ilman and Don Schollander set a new world record of 3:33.2 in the 4×100; then Clark, Roy Saari, Ilman and Schollander set a new world mark of 7:52.1 in the 4×200.

In individual competition, he finished fourth in the 100-metre freestyle event final. In a controversial outcome, both Ilman and German swimmer Hans-Joachim Klein were officially timed at 54.0 seconds (to 1/10 of a second), and were still tied at 54.00 (to 1/100 of a second) using the new unofficial electronic timing, but the judges on their own initiative awarded the bronze medal solely to Klein on the basis of the unofficial electronic time taken to 1/1,000 of a second.

Ilman finished his international swimming career at the 1965 World University Games in Budapest, Hungary, where he won a pair of gold medals as a member of the winning U.S. relay teams in the 4×100-metre and 4×200-metre freestyle relay events, and a bronze medal in the 100-metre freestyle. Ilman died August 16, 2014 at age 71.

See also
 List of California State University, Long Beach people
 List of Olympic medalists in swimming (men)
 World record progression 4 × 100 metres freestyle relay
 World record progression 4 × 200 metres freestyle relay

References

External links

 

1943 births
Living people
American male freestyle swimmers
World record setters in swimming
Long Beach State Beach swimmers
Olympic gold medalists for the United States in swimming
Sportspeople from Glendale, California
Swimmers at the 1963 Pan American Games
Swimmers at the 1964 Summer Olympics
Medalists at the 1964 Summer Olympics
Pan American Games gold medalists for the United States
Pan American Games medalists in swimming
Universiade medalists in swimming
Universiade gold medalists for the United States
Universiade bronze medalists for the United States
Medalists at the 1965 Summer Universiade
Medalists at the 1963 Pan American Games